Aeolopetra lanyuensis is a moth in the family Crambidae. It was described by Shen-Horn Yen in 1996. It is found in Taiwan, where it has been recorded from Lanyu Island.

References

Moths described in 1996
Musotiminae
Moths of Taiwan